Abhay Singh Chautala (born 14 February 1963) is an Indian politician. He is a member of the Haryana Legislative Assembly from  Ellenabad assembly constituency.

He was the leader of opposition from the party, INLD(also known as Lok Dal). He is the grandson of ex-deputy prime minister, Chaudhary Devi Lal and son of Haryana's ex-chief minister, Om Prakash Chautala.

Early life and education 
He was born in Chautala, Sirsa and studied at the S.M. Hindu Senior Secondary School, Sonepat. He acquired his bachelor's degree in arts from Haryana agricultural university, Hisar. A sports enthusiast, he has represented the state eight times in national volleyball championship and won numerous medals.

Political career
Chautala has been active in politics since his schooling days but he officially began his political career by contesting an election for the membership of Chautala village Panchayat and serving as its upsarpanch (deputy chief) for one term. He came into political limelight in the year 2000 when he won from Haryana's Rori Assembly constituency on INLD ticket with a record number of votes. While representing the constituency, he fulfilled his promise of opening an engineering college, which had been constructed in Panniwala Mota under the name of Jananayak Chaudhary Devi Lal Memorial College. In 2005, he was elected the President of the Zila Parishad, Sirsa and is currently holding that position. In 2009 he won the by-election from Ellenabad state constituency. In 2014, he was re-elected as MLA and joined the Vidhan Sabha as the leader of opposition. During the 2014 Lok Sabha elections, he was lauded for his leadership and organizational skills for leading INLD into winning 2 MP seats despite the strong Modi Wave. As an MLA, he was instrumental in the infrastructural, educational and sports development of his state.

In January 2021, Chautala resigned from the Haryana Assembly over the three farm legislations.

Sports development 
Abhay Chautala has been the torch bearer of sports development in Haryana. He introduced a new policy which had significantly boosted sports and games in the state. The policy provides for sports quota reservations for government jobs and educational institutions. It provides for diet allowances for sport professionals and lucrative prizes for international medal winners. Abhay Chautala has set up rural stadiums and coaching institutions in various parts of the state. As a result of his successful endeavours in the field of sports he was elected for various leading positions at reputable sport organisations.

Positions held in sports organisations

Women empowerment programs 
A believer of equal stature for women, Abhay has extensively worked to empower them. He propagated the right to education for girls with the launch of 'Shrimati Haraki Devi Memorial College for Women,' where meritorious girls are provided fee concessions along with free lodging. He also introduced the scheme that provided free transportation facilities to girls travelling from nearby villages to educational institutions. It was his encouragement that led an activation participation of girls in sports, which was earlier dominated by men.

Personal life
Abhay Singh Chautala is the youngest son of politician Om Prakash Chautala and Sneh Lata. He married Supriya in March 1987, who died on 11 November 1988 under suspicious circumstances at the age of 19. Later, he married Kanta Chautala and has two sons, Karan Singh Chautala and Arjun Singh Chautala.

External links

References

Living people
1963 births
Indian National Lok Dal politicians
Haryana district councillors
People from Sirsa district
Leaders of the Opposition in Haryana
Haryana MLAs 2019–2024
Haryana MLAs 2014–2019
Abhay
Indian sports executives and administrators